Noura bint Mohammed Al Kaabi is an Emirati politician and businesswoman who is currently the Minister of Culture and Youth for the United Arab Emirates. She has held the position since October 2017. Previously she was the Minister of State for Federal National Council Affairs from February 2016 to October 2017. She has also been the chairperson of the twofour54 since 2012 and of Abu Dhabi Media since 2017.

Education

Al Kaabi received her high school education in Abu Dhabi and Pennsylvania. She received a Bachelor of Arts in management information systems from the United Arab Emirates University in 2001.  In 2011 she completed the Executive Leadership Programme from the London Business School.

Career

Al Kaabi served in a management position in Dolphin Energy before joining twofour54 in October 2007. There she worked as head of human development from 2011, before becoming CEO in February 2012.

Al Kaabi was appointed to the Federal National Council (FNC) from Abu Dhabi in November 2011 and re-appointed in November 2015. On 10February 2016, she was appointed as the Minister of State for Federal National Council Affairs in the Cabinet of the United Arab Emirates (UAE Cabinet). In her capacity as Minister of State for Federal National Council Affairs, she acted as facilitator between the cabinet and the FNC. In June 2016, Al Kaabi was appointed chairwoman of the Abu Dhabi National Exhibitions Company and on 12April 2017 chairwoman of Abu Dhabi Media. She was appointed as Minister for Culture and Knowledge Development in the UAE Cabinet on 19October 2017.

 she is a board member of the UAE National Media Council, Image Nation, the Abu Dhabi Sports Council and the United Arab Emirates University.

On 5 July 2020 she was appointed the Minister of Culture and Youth following a restructuring of government portfolios.

Recognition
In 2011 and again in 2012, Al Kaabi was named by Arabian Business as one of the "100 Most Powerful Arab Women". In 2013, she became the first Emirati to be ranked among the Foreign Policy Magazines Top 100 Global Thinkers. The same year, she was named by Le Nouvel Observateur as one of the "50 individuals who contribute to changing the world" and by Arabian Business as one of the "100 Most Powerful Arab Women". In 2014, Al Kaabi was named by Forbes Middle East as one of the 30 Most Influential Women in Government. She was awarded "Business Woman of the Year" at the Gulf Business Awards and received the “Young Achiever Award” at the AmCham, Abu Dhabi’s Annual Excellence Awards. She has been a young global leader at the World Economic Forum since 2014. In 2015 LinkedIn named Al Kaabi as a global influencer and she became the first woman from MENA to enter LinkedIn's Global Influencer Program. The same year, she was honoured by America Abroad Media. She was also named as one of the 25 most powerful women in global television by The Hollywood Reporter.

In December 2020 Moon Jae-in, President of South Korea, presented Al Kaabi with the "Diplomatic Service Medal" in recognition for her efforts to enhance the relations between the UAE and South Korea.

References

External links

Living people
Emirati women in business
Emirati chief executives
Women government ministers of the United Arab Emirates
Alumni of London Business School
United Arab Emirates University alumni
Year of birth missing (living people)